Carlo Fantom (died December 1643) was a Croat mercenary in the English Civil War who had the reputation of being impervious to bullets and is quoted as saying "I care not for your Cause; I come to fight for your halfe-crown and your handsome women. My father was a Roman Catholique, and so was my grandfather. I have fought for the Christians against the Turkes, and for the Turkes against the Christians."

Career
Initially serving in Arthur Goodwin's regiment of horse, where he was valued by the Earl of Essex for training cavalrymen how to fight on horseback, in 1643 he changed sides to fight for the King. He was reportedly hanged at Bedford for raping a woman, while the army was marching to relieve Gainsborough.

Afterlife
The sparse details of his life inspired Reginald Hill's Captain Fantom: Being an account of the Sundry Adventures in the life of Carlo Fantom, Soldier of Misfortune, Hard-man and Ravisher (London, 1978), published under the pen-name Charles Underhill.

References

Year of birth unknown
1643 deaths
Roundheads
Cavaliers
Executed military personnel
People executed for rape
Mercenaries
People executed by hanging